And Just Like That... is an American comedy-drama television series developed by Michael Patrick King for HBO Max. It is a revival and a sequel of the HBO television series Sex and the City created by Darren Star, which is based on Candace Bushnell's newspaper column and 1996 book anthology of the same name.

Development for the series began in December 2020, following the cancellation of a third film adaptation. It was given a straight-to-series order in January 2021 by HBO Max. Casting announcements were made throughout 2021 and filming started in July 2021 in New York City.

And Just Like That... premiered on HBO Max on December 9, 2021, with mixed reviews. The season finale was released on February 3, 2022. Billed as a miniseries, the series was renewed for a second season in March 2022.

Overview
Set 11 years after the events of the 2010 film Sex and the City 2, from their friendship in their 30s to a more complicated reality of life and friendship in their 50s, the women of Sex and the City make their transition.

Cast and characters

Main

Sarah Jessica Parker as Carrie Bradshaw
Cynthia Nixon as Miranda Hobbes
Kristin Davis as Charlotte York Goldenblatt
Mario Cantone as Anthony Marentino
David Eigenberg as Steve Brady
Willie Garson as Stanford Blatch (season 1)
Evan Handler as Harry Goldenblatt
Sara Ramirez as Che Diaz
Chris Noth as Mr. Big / John James Preston (season 1)
Sarita Choudhury as Seema Patel

Recurring

 Nicole Ari Parker as Lisa Todd Wexley
 Karen Pittman as Dr. Nya Wallace
 Bobby Lee as Jackie Nee
 Chris Jackson as Herbert Wexley
 LeRoy McClain as Andre Rashad Wallace
 Cathy Ang as Lily Goldenblatt
 Alexa Swinton as Rose "Rock" Goldenblatt
 Niall Cunningham as Brady Hobbes
 Cree Cicchino as Luisa Torres
 Ivan Hernandez as Franklyn
 Brenda Vaccaro as Gloria Marquette
 John Corbett as Aidan Shaw (season 2)
 Tony Danza (season 2)

Guest starring

 Julie Halston as Bitsy von Muffling
 Pat Bowie as Eunice Wexley
 Alexander Bello as Henry Wexley
 Molly Price as Susan Sharon
 Bridget Moynahan as Natasha Naginsky-Mills
 Jon Tenney as Peter
 Jonathan Groff as Dr. Paul David
 Hari Nef as Rabbi Jen
 Frank Wood as Norman

Episodes

Production

Development
In December 2016, Radar Online reported that a script for a third Sex and the City film had been approved. However, on September 28, 2017, Sarah Jessica Parker confirmed that the third film was not going to happen. She said, "We had this beautiful, funny, heartbreaking,
joyful, very relatable script and story. It's not just disappointing that we don't get to tell the story and have that experience, but more so for that audience that has been so vocal in wanting another movie." It was reported in 2018 that Kim Cattrall did not want to return as Samantha Jones in the film due to disagreeing with its planned storylines, involving killing off Mr. Big and Samantha receiving sexting and nude pictures from Miranda's 14-year-old son, Brady. Cattrall later clarified in 2019 that she opted not to appear in a third film, explaining she "went past the finish line" portraying the character of Samantha because of her love for the franchise.

In December 2020, it was reported that the proposed third film's script had been redeveloped as a miniseries revival of the original Sex and the City television series in development at HBO Max, without Cattrall returning as Samantha, in line with her previous comments. In January 2021, And Just Like That... was confirmed by HBO Max as a series which would consist of 10 episodes. In February 2021, Samantha Irby, Rachna Fruchbom, Keli Goff, Julie Rottenberg and Elisa Zuritsky joined the series as part of the writing team. Rotternberg and Zuritsky also serve as executive producers. It was also confirmed that long-time series costume designer and collaborator Patricia Field would not be returning to work on the revival.  However, she recommended her friend and colleague Molly Rogers to the creative team for consultation. On March 22, 2022, HBO Max renewed the series for a second season.

Casting
Upon the series order announcement, Sarah Jessica Parker, Cynthia Nixon, and Kristin Davis were reprising their roles as close friends living in New York City.  In May 2021, Sara Ramírez was cast as a series regular, while Chris Noth was cast to reprise his role in an undisclosed capacity. On June 9, 2021, Mario Cantone, Willie Garson, David Eigenberg, and Evan Handler all joined the cast to reprise their respective roles in undisclosed capacities. In July 2021, Sarita Choudhury, Nicole Ari Parker, Karen Pittman, and Isaac Cole Powell joined the cast in starring roles while Alexa Swinton, Cree Cicchino, Niall Cunningham, and Cathy Ang were cast in undisclosed capacities and Brenda Vaccaro and Ivan Hernandez were cast in recurring roles. In August 2021, Julie Halston was cast to reprise her role in a guest-starring capacity while Christopher Jackson and LeRoy McClain were cast in recurring roles. Willie Garson, who played Stanford Blatch throughout Sex And The City and reprised his role in the new series, died on September 21, only three months after his return, after filming his scenes for the series' first three episodes. The new series explained his absence via a letter to Carrie in episode four. On November 8, 2021, Bobby Lee announced on an Instagram post that he has a small role in the revival.

Despite Mr. Big dying in the first episode, Noth was set to appear as Big in a fantasy sequence in the season finale, but he was edited out after sexual assault allegations were brought against him.

On August 19, 2022, John Corbett was cast to reprise his role as Aidan Shaw in a recurring capacity for the second season. On October 18, 2022, Tony Danza joined the cast in a recurring role as Che's father.

Filming
Production began in June 2021 in New York City. The first table read was held on June 11, 2021, at the show's studio in Manhattan. Filming had commenced on location in New York City by July 9, 2021, and was commemorated by the release of a promotional photo of Parker, Nixon and Davis on the streets of Manhattan. To mislead speculation about a major plot line, Noth arrived on location the day his character's funeral was filmed. On October 11, 2021, it was reported that filming had taken place on location in Paris, France. Filming concluded on December 6, 2021.
Filming for the second season began on October 4, 2022 in New York City.

Release
The series premiered on December 9, 2021, with the first two episodes available immediately and the rest debuting on a weekly basis until the season finale on February 3, 2022.

Home media
The first season was released on DVD, on December 13, 2022. A Blu-ray version is not yet revealed.

Reception

Audience viewership
Despite HBO Max not revealing subscriber viewership for its original programming, And Just Like That... was announced to have delivered the service's most-watched series debut to date, including both HBO and HBO Max originals premiered on the service. The series placed within the service's top 10 most-watched premieres including film debuts. The series was the most-watched first viewing in the service's history, implying that new subscribers enlisted to watch the series.

Critical response

The review aggregator website Rotten Tomatoes reported a 48% approval rating with an average rating of 5.5/10 based on 79 critic reviews. The website's critics consensus reads, "And Just Like That... fails to recapture Sex and the Citys heady fizz, but like a fine wine, these characters have developed subtler depths with age." Metacritic, which uses a weighted average, assigned a score of 55 out of 100 based on 33 critics, indicating "mixed or average reviews". The New York Times review, while stating that the show "in moments is very good," described it as "painful" and "part dramedy about heartbreak, part awkward bid at relevance," writing "when you are [reviving] a series there is the fatal danger of losing your touch. And there you have 'And Just Like That'."

The themes of diversity and social justice were criticized. The Telegraph described it as "tediously woke", and the Radio Times wrote: "The main three's newfound social and cultural awareness is shoe-horned in to such a degree the whole endeavour feels often cloying.'" Deadline Hollywood wrote that "far too many 2021 cultural touchstones and new characters are awkwardly parachuted into [the show] ... as if to check a box". EmpireOnline added: "the attempts to paint a rich, real, diverse world are ham-fisted, inauthentic and riddled with self-consciousness, awkwardness and moments of self-congratulation." Specifically, the character of Che Díaz was derided heavily online and has been considered to be one of the worst characters in television history. Kristin Corry of Vice Media criticized the tokenization of Black characters, writing "The 'Sex and the City' reboot wants to undo its colorblind legacy by including Black characters. Unfortunately, they're treated as luxury accessories."

Response from Peloton
After the episode in which Chris Noth's character dies following a Peloton bike workout, the stock for the company dropped significantly. The company issued a statement through Dr. Suzanne Steinbaum, a cardiologist and member of the company's health and wellness advisory, saying that they agreed to the product placement but were not aware of how it would be used in the pivotal scene. The statement also said not to blame the company for the character's death, and cited some contributing factors, such as his lifestyle (e.g., his consumption of steaks and cigars) and a cardiac surgery in a previous season. Three days after the episode aired, the company released an ad, featuring Chris Noth and narrated by Ryan Reynolds, with Reynolds quickly citing the benefits of cycling and ending with "He's alive." Four days later, the ad was removed after sexual assault allegations were reported against Chris Noth.

Accolades 
The series was given the Seal of Authentic Representation from the Ruderman Family Foundation for the portrayal of Steve Brady by David Eigenberg, and Chloe by Ali Stroker, as actors with disabilities and at least five lines of dialogue. The series was recognized with The ReFrame Stamp for hiring people of underrepresented gender identities, and of color.

Other media
A documentary that serves as a behind-the-scenes look of the series titled as And Just Like That... The Documentary was released on February 3, 2022.

Notes

References

External links

2020s American comedy-drama television series
2020s American LGBT-related comedy television series
2020s American LGBT-related drama television series
2020s American romantic comedy television series
2020s American sex comedy television series
2021 American television series debuts
American sequel television series
English-language television shows
HBO Max original programming
Sex and the City
Television shows filmed in New York City
Television shows set in Manhattan